Javadiyeh Metro Station is a station in line 3 of the Tehran Metro. It is located in the Javadiyeh neighbourhood of Tehran. The station has access through two long walkways, one to a local street, another to a pedestrian bridge crossing rail lines into Javadiyeh.

References

Tehran Metro stations
Railway stations opened in 2013
2013 establishments in Iran